The 1972 VMI Keydets football team was an American football team that represented the Virginia Military Institute (VMI) as a member of the Southern Conference (SoCon) during the 1972 NCAA University Division football season. In their second year under head coach Bob Thalman, the team compiled an overall record of 2–9 with a mark of 1–5 in conference play, placing sixth in the SoCon.

Schedule

References

VMI
VMI Keydets football seasons
VMI Keydets football